The 1899 Kilkenny Senior Hurling Championship was the 11th staging of the Kilkenny Senior Hurling Championship since its establishment by the Kilkenny County Board.

Tullaroan won the championship after a 3-06 to 1-05 defeat of Young Irelands in the final. This was their fifth championship title overall and their first in two championship seasons.

References

Kilkenny Senior Hurling Championship
Kilkenny Senior Hurling Championship